Lancaster Park, formerly also known as AMI Stadium, is a 13,000 capacity cricket stadium situated in a suburb of Christchurch in New Zealand. The stadium is currently closed due to damage sustained in the February 2011 Christchurch earthquake. The Hadlee Stand has been demolished and the fate of the rest of the stadium is unresolved. It was New Zealand's oldest Test cricket venue before it was demolished. The ground was the venue for 40 men's Test matches, 48 One-Day Internationals (ODI) and four Twenty20 Internationals (T20I). The first Test match at the ground was between New Zealand and England on 10 January 1930, with the first ODI between New Zealand and Pakistan in February 1973 and the first T20I was played in February 2008 between New Zealand and England. Two women's Test matches have been played on the ground, the first in 1935, as well as seven women's ODIs and one women's T20I.

In cricket, a five-wicket haul (also known as a "five-for" or "fifer") refers to a bowler taking five or more wickets in a single innings. This is regarded as a notable achievement.

The first bowler to take a five-wicket haul in a Test match at Lancaster Park was Maurice Allom, who took five wickets for 38 runs for England against New Zealand in 1930. Phil Tufnell of England has the best Test match innings bowling figures on the ground, taking 7/47 in 1992, whilst fellow Englishman Derek Underwood has the best match figures on the ground, taking 12/97 in 1971.

The first five-wicket haul in an ODI on the ground was achieved by Richard Collinge who took 5 for 23 for New Zealand against India in 1976. Australian Simon O'Donnell recorded the best ODI bowling figures at the venue with 5/13 against New Zealand in 1990.

Key

Test match five-wicket hauls

There have been 44 five-wicket hauls taken in men's Test matches and two in women's Tests on the ground.

Men's matches

Women's matches

One Day International five-wickethauls

A total of five five-wicket hauls have been taken in One Day International matches on the ground.

Notes

References

External links
 International five-wicket hauls at Lancaster Park, CricInfo.

New Zealand cricket lists
Lancaster Park